Our Prime Minister is a 1957 Indian English language short biographical documentary film based on the life of Pandit Jawaharlal Nehru, the first Prime Minister of independent Republic of India. The film was produced, compiled and directed by Ezra Mir.

See also
 "Tryst with Destiny"(1947 speech)
 "The light has gone out of our lives" (1948 speech)
 Three weeks in the life of Prime Minister Nehru (1962 film)
 Nehru (1984 film)

References

1957 films
1950s English-language films
1950s short documentary films
Indian short documentary films
Films directed by Shyam Benegal
Indian biographical films
Indian political films
Cultural depictions of prime ministers of India
Indian Independence Movement
Indian independence movement fiction
Indian independence movement
Films set in the Indian independence movement
National Film Award (India) winners